George Howarth (1854 – 28 June 1908) was an English-born Australian politician.

He was born in Kent, and became a mariner before eventually settling in Sydney in 1883. He worked as a wool presser on the Lachlan River and at Booligal before becoming a staff surveyor and then a butcher. On 26 January 1891 he married Ellen Elizabeth Hammond; they had three children. He was a Willoughby alderman from 1892 to 1895 and from 1900 to 1901. In 1895 he was elected to the New South Wales Legislative Assembly as the Free Trade member for Willoughby, serving until he was declared bankrupt in 1903. He then became a storekeeper. Howarth died at Colyton in 1908.

References

 

1854 births
1908 deaths
Members of the New South Wales Legislative Assembly
Free Trade Party politicians
19th-century Australian politicians